Željko Tadić (born 9 June 1974) is a Montenegrin former professional footballer who played as a goalkeeper.

Club career
He was born in Nikšić, Montenegro, and was one of the Yugoslav players who moved to Brazil in 2001, when Dejan Petković was in good form. He played with Petković in 2001, when they were part of Radnički Niš' squad. Tadić moved from Partizan to  XV de Piracicaba in 2001. He then moved in the same year to Londrina. His name was misspelled as Tandic by the Brazilian press. He defended Bragantino in 2002 and German club Weinheim in 2003.

The goalkeeper left Uberaba and joined Vasco da Gama in 2004, after a suggestion by the club's main star Dejan Petković. His performance in the Rio de Janeiro club was poor, he played seven Série A games and conceded 14 goals. He later sued the club for failing to pay his wages.

After leaving Vasco, he joined Guarani of Divinópolis. He then retired and worked as Dejan Petković's agent.

References 

1974 births
Living people
Footballers from Nikšić
Association football goalkeepers
Serbia and Montenegro footballers
FK Radnički Niš players
FK Budućnost Podgorica players
FK Partizan players
Esporte Clube XV de Novembro (Piracicaba) players
Londrina Esporte Clube players
Clube Atlético Bragantino players
Uberaba Sport Club players
CR Vasco da Gama players
Guarani Esporte Clube (MG) players
First League of Serbia and Montenegro players
Serbia and Montenegro expatriate footballers
Expatriate footballers in Brazil
Serbia and Montenegro expatriate sportspeople in Brazil
Expatriate footballers in Germany
Serbia and Montenegro expatriate sportspeople in Germany